Solo Collection is a greatest hits album of Glenn Frey's solo career, released March 28, 1995 on MCA Records.

Reception

AllMusic reviewer Stephen Thomas Erlewine gave the album four and a half stars out of five, stating "Solo Collection performs a welcome service by collecting the highlights from his decidedly uneven solo albums, including all of his biggest hits. Not only is it a perfect introduction, it's arguably the most consistent solo record Frey ever released."

The album did not chart in its initial 1995 release, but reached No. 82 on Billboard 200 in 2016 after Frey's death.

Track listing
"This Way to Happiness" (Frey, Oliver, Tempchin) – 3:26
"Who's Been Sleeping in My Bed?" (Tempchin, Whitlock) – 4:05
"Common Ground" (Frey, Tempchin) – 4:43
"Call on Me" (Frey, Tempchin) – 4:10
"The One You Love" (Frey, Tempchin) – 4:33
"Sexy Girl" (Frey, Tempchin) – 3:30
"Smuggler's Blues" (Frey, Tempchin) – 3:50
"The Heat Is On" (Harold Faltermeyer, Keith Forsey) – 3:46
"You Belong to the City" (Frey, Tempchin) – 5:52
"True Love" (Frey, Tempchin) – 4:40
"Soul Searchin'" (Cameron, Frey, Tempchin) – 5:35
"Part of Me, Part of You" (Frey, Tempchin) – 5:57
"I've Got Mine" (Frey, Tempchin) – 5:35
"River of Dreams" (Frey, Tempchin) – 6:08
"Rising Sun/Brave New World" (Frey, Oliver, Scheiner, Tempchin) – 7:00
"Strange Weather" (live) (Frey, Tempchin, Oliver) – 5:04 (only available on the import version)

Charts

References

Glenn Frey albums
1995 greatest hits albums
MCA Records compilation albums